Holland, Manitoba is an unincorporated community recognized as a local urban district in the Rural Municipality of Victoria, in Manitoba.

It is located at the junction of Highway 2 and Highway 34, along the Canadian Pacific Railway tracks.

Spruce Woods Provincial Park is located north-west of the community.

Community facilities include an elementary school, a public library, fire department, a supermarket, a convenience store, a hardware, a post office and a medical clinic. A skating arena and curling rink are open during the winter months only. A farm machinery dealership lies opposite the town across Highway 2.

Residents of Holland are known as "Hollanders". Holland is the administrative centre of the surrounding municipality of Victoria and home to the LaSalle Redboine Conservation District and the Tiger Hills Arts Association.

Demographics 

Our Lady of the Prairies, and Trappist Cheese
A nearby Trappist monastery, Our Lady of the Prairies, once made fromage de la trappe.

Notable people
Glen Harmon, NHL all-star
Ken Leishman, criminal known for robberies between 1957 and 1966

References

Designated places in Manitoba
Local urban districts in Manitoba